Diarmuid O'Neill (also known as Dermot O'Neill) (born 24 June 1969 in Hammersmith, London, England – 23 September 1996), was a volunteer in the Provisional Irish Republican Army (IRA). O'Neill was killed in London in 1996 during a police raid on the hotel where he and two other IRA volunteers were staying. Due to the circumstances surrounding the killing, Amnesty International has called for a review of the police investigation into the killing of O'Neill. O'Neill was the only IRA member to be killed by police in Great Britain.

Background
O'Neill was born and raised in London, the youngest son of Irish parents, Eoghan and Theresa "Terry" O'Neill who were originally from County Kildare and County Dublin. O'Neill had one sister, Siobhán, and one brother, Shane. He was a former pupil of the London Oratory School, a Roman Catholic school in Fulham, in London, where he was remembered as cheerful, well-behaved and outgoing. From an early age he took an interest in Irish culture and nationalism and spent much of his time between County Cork and London. O'Neill was also deeply involved in supporting Basque nationalism and had visited the Basque Country on several occasions along with his Basque born girlfriend, Karmele Ereno. While he was known to have republican views, very few knew of his involvement in the IRA until a few days after his killing by the London Metropolitan Police.
 
Soon after leaving school, O'Neill served nine months in a young offenders' institution for his part in a £75,000 cash fraud from a Bank of Ireland branch in Shepherd's Bush, west London, where he worked. Some of the stolen cash was siphoned to the IRA.

Death
O'Neill was shot and killed by London Metropolitan Police's specialist firearms unit, SO19, at Glenthorne Road, Hammersmith, London in September 1996, during a raid on suspected IRA weapons operations.

Surveillance operation
In the six weeks leading up to the shooting of O'Neill, the Metropolitan Police of London had kept O'Neill and fellow IRA Volunteers, Brian McHugh and Patrick Kelly, under intensive police surveillance including bugging of O'Neill's room and video surveillance. Commander John Grieve, who was Head of the Metropolitan Police Anti-Terrorist Branch at the time, stated that the extent of that operation exceeded that of others carried out in Britain by far.

The surveillance operation resulted in extensive video footage that reportedly covered the whole six weeks except the night of the raid on the hotel itself. These surveillance tapes suggested O'Neill's unit was planning to detonate a large lorry bomb in central London, and that the IRA men were ready to shoot to kill if the police tried to raid them.

Hotel raid
At 4.30 am, on 23 September, the Metropolitan Police conducted a raid on the hotel with the expressed intention of arresting all three. O'Neill was shot six times by a police officer who was only identified as "Officer Kilo". According to a report by Amnesty International, he was shot while trying to surrender and was then denied immediate medical care despite there being an ambulance at the scene. O'Neill later died in hospital. The results of the post-mortem examination carried out on the body of O'Neill showed a "patterned" bruise on his scalp which, in the opinion of the pathologist for the British Home Office, may have resulted from "an individual treading on his head".

After the raid, media reports claimed that there had been armed violent resistance during the raid. However these stories were denied and withdrawn when it became clear that O'Neill was not carrying a weapon at the time of the shooting. According to CAIN, ten tonnes of home-made explosives, two pounds of Semtex, rifles and other bomb equipment were recovered at another location following the raid.

Criminal Investigation Bureau
The Criminal Investigation Bureau of the Metropolitan Police, supervised by the Police Complaints Authority, subsequently conducted an investigation into the incident. The investigation took almost two years and produced a report in 1999 which stated that there was not enough evidence to prosecute the police officers involved in the killing.

Inquest
In February 2000, an inquest was held into O'Neill's death. The jury at Kingston upon Thames Crown Court took four hours to reach a majority verdict to rule that he was killed lawfully. Metropolitan Police Deputy Assistant Commissioner Alan Fry, head of New Scotland Yard's anti-terrorist branch, said: "The decision by the jury supports the actions by Officer Kilo and others who were faced with dangerous terrorists who were planning to bomb London and had access to explosives and firearms."

O'Neill was buried at St. Mologas'  Cemetery, Timoleague, County Cork, Ireland.

Legacy
Every year since his death Sinn Féin has organised a commemoration in his memory and is attended by relatives. Musician Gary Og wrote a song about him titled 'Diarmuid O'Neill'.

References

1969 births
1996 deaths
Deaths by firearm in London
English people of Irish descent
Irish republicans
People educated at London Oratory School
People from Hammersmith
People killed by security forces during The Troubles (Northern Ireland)
Provisional Irish Republican Army members
Metropolitan Police operations